The 1984 Virginia Slims of Pennsylvania, also known as the Ginny of Central Pennsylvania,  was a women's tennis tournament played on women's indoor carpet courts at the Hershey Racquet Club in Hershey, Pennsylvania in the United States that was part of the Ginny Tournament Circuit of the 1984 Virginia Slims World Championship Series. The tournament was held from January 9 through January 15, 1984. Unseeded Catarina Lindqvist won the singles title.

Finals

Singles
 Catarina Lindqvist defeated  Beth Herr 6–4, 6–0
 It was Lindqvist's 1st singles career title.

Doubles
 Marcela Skuherská /  Kateřina Böhmová defeated  Ann Henricksson /  Nancy Yeargin 6–1, 6–3
 It was Skuherská's only career title. It was Böhmová's first title of the year and the second of her career.

Notes

References

External links
 ITF tournament edition details
 Tournament pamphlet

Virginia Slims of Pennsylvania
Virginia Slims of Pennsylvania